Geitodoris is a genus of sea slugs, dorid nudibranchs, shell-less marine gastropod mollusks in the family Discodorididae.

Species 
Species in the genus Geitodoris include:

 Geitodoris bacalladoi  Ortea, 1990 
 Geitodoris bonosi  Ortea & Ballesteros, 1981 
 Geitodoris capensis  Bergh, 1907 
 Geitodoris granulata   Lin & Wu, 1994
 Geitodoris heathi  Macfarland, 1905
 Geitodoris immunda   Bergh, 1894
 Geitodoris joubini  (Vayssière, 1919) 
 Geitodoris mavis   (Marcus & Marcus, 1967)
 Geitodoris pallida  Valdes, 2001 
 Geitodoris patagonica   Odhner, 1926 Synonyms: Geitodoris falklandica
 Geitodoris perfossa  Ortea, 1990 
 Geitodoris planata  (Alder & Hancock, 1846)  Synonyms: Geitodoris complanata
 Geitodoris portmanni  (Schmekel, 1972) 
 Geitodoris pusae  (Marcus Er., 1955) 
 Geitodoris reticulata  Eliot, 1906 
 Geitodoris rubens  (Vayssière, 1919)  
 Geitodoris tema  (Edmunds, 1968)

References

External links 

Discodorididae
Gastropod genera